The  is the sole unit of the Air Development and Test Command of the Japan Air Self-Defense Force based at Gifu Air Field in Gifu Prefecture, Japan.

Aircraft operated
 Kawasaki C-1FTB
 Kawasaki C-2 
 Kawasaki T-4
 Fuji T-7
 McDonnell Douglas F-4EJ Kai Phantom II (1971–2021)
 Mitsubishi F-2
 Mitsubishi F-15J
 Mitsubishi X-2 Shinshin

See also 
 List of aerospace flight test centres

References

Units of the Japan Air Self-Defense Force